The following is the filmography for Canadian actor Michael Ironside.

Film

Television

Video games

References

External links

Male actor filmographies
Canadian filmographies